Amazon Mutual Wants You!: Volume One is a 1982 role-playing game adventure published by Dragon Tree Press.

Contents
Amazon Mutual Wants You!: Volume One consists of four adventures in which the player characters are hired by Amazon Mutual Life Insurance to recover bodies of policyholders.

Reception
Lewis Pulsipher reviewed Amazon Mutual Wants You!: Volume One in The Space Gamer No. 50. Pulsipher commented that "Virtually all modules from such manufacturers as TSR, Gamelords, and Midkemia are better buys for [the price] than Amazon Mutual."

References

Fantasy role-playing game adventures
Role-playing game supplements introduced in 1982